Ninth Street Hill Neighborhood Historic District is a national historic district located at Lafayette, Tippecanoe County, Indiana.  The district encompasses 88 contributing buildings and 6 contributing structures in a predominantly residential section of Lafayette.  It developed between about 1850 and 1946 and includes representative examples of Gothic Revival, Italianate, Queen Anne, Greek Revival, and Second Empire style architecture. Located in the district is the separately listed Judge Cyrus Ball House.  Other notable contributing resources include the Samuel Moore House (1891), Moore-Porter-Boswell House (1895), Stanley Coulter House (1890), Edward Bohrer House (1909), Thomas Wood House (c. 1850), Job M. Nash House (1859), and Gordon Graham House (c. 1900).

It was listed on the National Register of Historic Places in 1997.

See also
Centennial Neighborhood District
Downtown Lafayette Historic District
Ellsworth Historic District
Highland Park Neighborhood Historic District
Jefferson Historic District
Park Mary Historic District
Perrin Historic District
St. Mary Historic District
Upper Main Street Historic District

References

Historic districts on the National Register of Historic Places in Indiana
Gothic Revival architecture in Indiana
Italianate architecture in Indiana
Greek Revival architecture in Indiana
Queen Anne architecture in Indiana
Second Empire architecture in Indiana
Neighborhoods in Lafayette, Indiana
Historic districts in Lafayette, Indiana
National Register of Historic Places in Tippecanoe County, Indiana